The 2006 NCAA Division I men's ice hockey tournament involved 16 schools playing in single-elimination play to determine the national champion of men's  NCAA Division I college ice hockey. It began on March 24, 2006, and ended with the championship game on April 8. A total of 15 games were played.

The tournament is remembered for the win by Holy Cross over Minnesota which is typically considered one of if not the biggest upset in tournament history.

Game locations

The NCAA Men's Division I Ice Hockey Championship is a single-elimination tournament featuring 16 teams representing all six Division I conferences in the nation.  The Championship Committee seeds the entire field from 1 to 16 within four regionals of 4 teams. The winners of the six Division I conference championships receive automatic bids to participate in the NCAA Championship. Regional placements are based primarily on the home location of the top seed in each bracket with an attempt made to put the top-ranked teams close to their home site.

Regional Sites
 East – Pepsi Arena, Albany, New York — Host: Rensselaer Polytechnic Institute and the ECAC Hockey League
 Midwest – Resch Center, Green Bay, Wisconsin — Host: Michigan Technological University
 Northeast – DCU Center, Worcester, Massachusetts — Host: Boston University
 West – Ralph Engelstad Arena, Grand Forks, North Dakota — Host: University of North Dakota

Frozen Four
 Bradley Center, Milwaukee, Wisconsin — Host: University of Wisconsin–Madison

Qualifying teams
The at-large bids and seeding for each team in the tournament was announced on March 19, 2006. The Central Collegiate Hockey Association (CCHA), Hockey East and the Western Collegiate Hockey Association (WCHA) each had four teams receive a berth in the tournament, the ECACHL had two teams receive a berth in the tournament, while Atlantic Hockey and College Hockey America (CHA) both received a single bid for their tournament champions.

Number in parentheses denotes overall seed in the tournament.

Brackets

East Regional

Midwest Regional

Northeast Regional

West Regional

Frozen Four

Note: * denotes overtime period(s)

East Regional

Regional semifinals

(1) Michigan State vs. (4) New Hampshire

(2) Harvard vs. (3) Maine

Regional Finals

(1) Michigan State vs. (3) Maine

Midwest Regional

Regional semifinals

(1) Wisconsin vs. (4) Bemidji State

(2) Cornell vs. (3) Colorado College

Regional Finals

(1) Wisconsin vs. (2) Cornell

Northeast Regional

Regional semifinals

(1) Boston University vs. (4) Nebraska-Omaha

(2) Miami vs. (3) Boston College

Regional Finals

(1) Boston University vs. (3) Boston College

West Regional

Regional semifinals

(1) Minnesota vs. (4) Holy Cross

(2) North Dakota vs. (3) Michigan

Regional Finals

(2) North Dakota vs. (4) Holy Cross

Frozen Four

National semifinal

(MW1) Wisconsin vs. (E3) Maine

(W2) North Dakota vs. (NE3) Boston College

National Championship

(MW1) Wisconsin vs. (NE3) Boston College

All-Tournament team
G: Brian Elliott (Wisconsin)
D: Tom Gilbert (Wisconsin)
D: Brett Motherwell (Boston College)
F: Adam Burish (Wisconsin)
F: Chris Collins (Boston College)
F: Robbie Earl* (Wisconsin)
* Most Outstanding Player(s)

Record by conference

References

Tournament
NCAA Division I men's ice hockey tournament
NCAA Division I men's ice hockey tournament
NCAA Division I men's ice hockey tournament
NCAA Division I men's ice hockey tournament
NCAA Division I men's ice hockey tournament
NCAA Division I men's ice hockey tournament
NCAA Division I men's ice hockey tournament
2000s in Milwaukee
History of Green Bay, Wisconsin
Ice hockey competitions in North Dakota
Sports competitions in Milwaukee
Ice hockey competitions in Albany, New York
Sports in Grand Forks, North Dakota
Sports in Green Bay, Wisconsin
Ice hockey competitions in Worcester, Massachusetts
College sports tournaments in Wisconsin